The 2019 Northwestern Wildcats football team represented Northwestern University during the 2019 NCAA Division I FBS football season. The Wildcats played their home games at Ryan Field in Evanston, Illinois and competed in the West Division of the Big Ten Conference. They were led by 14th-year head coach Pat Fitzgerald. They finished the season 3–9, 1–8 in Big Ten play to finish in last place in the West Division.

Previous season
The 2018 Wildcats team made the school's first ever appearance in the Big Ten Championship Game by winning the West Division with a conference record of 8–1. They fell to Ohio State in that game, and went on to defeat Utah in the Holiday Bowl to finish the season at 9–5 and ranked 21st in the final AP Poll.

Preseason

Preseason Big Ten poll
Although the Big Ten Conference has not held an official preseason poll since 2010, Cleveland.com has polled sports journalists representing all member schools as a de facto preseason media poll since 2011. For the 2019 poll, Northwestern was projected to finish in fourth in the West Division.

Schedule
Northwestern will open its 2019 schedule with two non-conference games, first on the road against Stanford of the Pac-12 Conference, and then the season home opener against UNLV of the Mountain West Conference. Northwestern's third non-conference game, against independent UMass, will be played in November.

In Big Ten Conference play, Northwestern will play all fellow members of the West Division, and draws Michigan State, Ohio State, and Indiana from the East Division. Northwestern's game against Ohio State, a rematch of the 2018 Big Ten Championship Game, will be played on a Friday night, a decision by the Big Ten Conference which drew ire from Northwestern officials and head coach Pat Fitzgerald.

Source:

Rankings

Game summaries

at Stanford

UNLV

Michigan State

at Wisconsin

at Nebraska

Ohio State

Iowa

at Indiana

Purdue

UMass

Minnesota

at Illinois

Roster

References

Northwestern
Northwestern Wildcats football seasons
Northwestern Wildcats football